The Port Subdivision is a railroad line owned by CSX Transportation in the U.S. state of New York. The line runs from Selkirk north to Albany along a former New York Central Railroad line. At its south end, the Port Subdivision junctions with the Castleton Subdivision and River Subdivision; its north end is at the Port of Albany, served by the Albany Port Railroad.

History
The line was opened by the New York, West Shore and Buffalo Railway in the 1880s. Through mergers, leases, and takeovers, it became part of the New York Central Railroad and Conrail. When Conrail was broken up in 1999, the Port Subdivision was assigned to CSX Transportation.

See also
List of CSX Transportation lines

References

CSX Transportation lines
Rail infrastructure in New York (state)
New York Central Railroad lines